In music, an accent is an emphasis, stress, or stronger attack placed on a particular note or set of notes, or chord, either as a result of its context or specifically indicated by an accent mark. Accents contribute to the articulation and prosody of a performance of a musical phrase. Accents may be written into a score or part by a composer or added by the performer as part of their interpretation of a musical piece.

Compared to surrounding notes:
 A dynamic accent or stress accent is an emphasis using louder sound or a stronger sound, typically most pronounced on the attack of the sound.
 A tonic accent is an emphasis on notes by virtue of being higher in pitch as opposed to higher in volume.
 An agogic accent is an emphasis by virtue of being longer in duration.

Accents which do not correspond to the stressed beats of the prevailing meter are said to be syncopated. For example, in common time, also called 4/4, the most common metre in popular music, the stressed beats are one and three. If accented chords or notes are played on beats two or four, this creates syncopation, as the music is emphasizing the "weak" beats of the bar. Syncopation is used in classical music, popular music and traditional music. However, it is more prominent in blues, jazz, funk, disco and Latin music.

Agogic
There are four kinds of agogic accents :
 Longer notated duration of a note, for example, a whole note/semibreve (four beats in common time) among quarter notes/crotchets (each of which gets one beat).
 Extended duration of a note within its full-time value (without altering the tempo). For example, players of organ and harpsichord (which do not allow the use of dynamic accents) can emphasize one of a sequence of staccato quarter notes by making it less staccato (that is, making one note longer to emphasize it).
 Extended duration of a note with the effect of temporarily slowing down the tempo (rubato or rallentando).
 Delayed onset of a note, for example by doing a pause before starting a note.

Marks
In music notation, an accent mark indicates a louder dynamic and a stronger attack to apply to a single note or an articulation mark. 

From left to right, the meanings of these articulation marks are explained below:

 The most common symbol is the horizontal wedge, the first symbol in the diagram above. This is the symbol that most musicians mean when they say accent mark. It indicates that the marked note should have an emphasized beginning and then taper off rather quickly. Though it is usually simply referred to as an accent. In jazz articulation, it is stated as "dah".

 The vertical wedge, shown second, signifies that a note should be played marcato (Italian for "marked"). It is generally accepted to be as loud as an accent mark and as short as a staccato. Martellato, Italian for "hammered", is another name for the marcato symbol used primarily by orchestral string musicians as it refers to the specific bowing technique used to create marcato. In jazz articulation, marcato is typically stated as "daht" yet the performing musician may interpret the duration of the note differently depending on what style of jazz they are playing.

 The dot, shown third, signifies that a note should be played staccato. It indicates that the last part of a note should be silenced to create separation between it and the following note. For example, a written quarter note should be played as an eighth note followed by an eighth rest. The duration of a staccato note may be about half as long as the note value would indicate, although the tempo and performers' taste varies this quite a bit. In jazz articulation, it is stated as "dit".

 The staccatissimo mark, shown fourth, is usually interpreted as shorter than the staccato, but composers up to the time of Mozart used these symbols interchangeably.  A staccatissimo crotchet (quarter note) would be correctly played in traditional art music as a lightly articulated semi-quaver (sixteenth note) followed by rests which fill the remainder of the beat.

 Finally, the tenuto mark, shown fifth above, generally means that a note or chord is to be played at full length. In jazz articulation, it is stated as "doo".

Even when these symbols are absent, experienced musicians will introduce the appropriate gesture according to the style of the music. Mark McGrain writes about articulation on page 156 in his book Music Notation: Theory and Technique for Music Notation. The marcato accent in the third mark shown is also known as the forzato accent. The notation commonly known as just an accent is also known as the sforzando accent. "Neither of these accents alter the durational value of the note or voicing they attend."

See also
 List of ornaments
 Sforzando

References

Articulations (music)
Rhythm and meter

ca:Accent (música)
fr:Accent (musique)